Amalapuram mandal is one of the 22 mandals in konaseema district of Andhra Pradesh. As per census 2011, there are 17 villages in this mandal.

Demographics 
Amalapur mandal has total population of 1,41,693 as per the 2011 Census out of which 71,098 are males while 70,595 are females. The average sex ratio is 993. The total literacy rate is 84%.

Towns & villages

Villages and Towns
1. A Vemavaram
2. Amalapuram town
3. Bandarulanka town
4. Bhatnavilli
5. Edarapalle
6. Gunnapalle Agraharam
7. Immidivarappadu
8. Indupalle
9. Janupalle
10. Nadipudi
11. Nallamilli
12. Palagummi
13. Peruru
14. Sakuru
15. Samanasa
16. Thandavapalle
17. Vanne Chintalapudi

See also 
List of mandals in Andhra Pradesh

References 

Mandals in Konaseema district
Mandals in Andhra Pradesh